Estigmene multivittata is a moth of the  family Erebidae. It was described by Rothschild in 1910. It is found in Ethiopia, Kenya and South Africa.

References

 Natural History Museum Lepidoptera generic names catalog

Spilosomina
Moths described in 1910
Insects of Ethiopia
Moths of Africa